Hermann III of Baden (c. 1105 – 16 January 1160), nicknamed the Great, was Margrave of Verona and Baden.

He was the son of Hermann II of Baden and Judith von Hohenberg. He was ruler of the margraviate of Baden from 1130 until 1160.

Faithfully devoted to the Staufens, Hermann III came in conflict with his relatives from Zähringen-Swabia. In 1140 he participated in the siege of Weibtreu castle, and received the bailiwick of Selz in Alsace.

In 1151 the margravate of Verona was taken from Ottokar III of Styria and conferred on Hermann III. A deed of donation exists from 1153, that states Frederick I bought Castle Besigheim from Hermann III.

Hermann III fought in the first Italian campaign of Emperor Frederick I, and gained the title margrave of Verona. 

Hermann III took part in the Second Crusade.

Marriage and children

He married Bertha von Lothringen (d. after 1162), in 1134; she was the daughter of Simon I, Duke of Lorraine, and his wife Adelaide of Leuven.
He had the following children:
Hermann IV (d. September 13, 1190)
Gertrud (d. before 1225) who married in 1180 Graf Albrecht von Dagsburg (d. 1211)

Secondly, he married Maria of Bohemia after 1141. She was the daughter of Duke Sobeslav I of Bohemia.

Hermann III was buried in the Augustine Monastery in Backnang.

References

Sources

House of Zähringen
Margraves of Baden
Christians of the Second Crusade
Burials at Backnang Abbey
1100s births
1160 deaths
Year of birth uncertain